David Gerald Brooks, 5th Baron Crawshaw (born 14 September 1934 – ) is a British peer and politician.

Life
He was born the son of Gerald Brooks, 3rd Baron Crawshaw and his wife Marjory Sheila Clifton and was educated at Eton College and the Royal Agricultural College in Cirencester.

He was High Sheriff of Leicestershire for 1985–86, has been President of Leicester Conservative Association since 2001 and president of Leicestershire Agricultural Society since 2009.

After the death of his brother William Brooks, 4th Baron Crawshaw in 1997 Brooks inherited his title and a seat in the House of Lords which he took on 8 December 1998, subsequently losing it as a result of the House of Lords Act 1999. He has not since stood for re-election.

Coat of arms

References

External links 
 David Gerald Brooks, 5th Baron Crawshaw of Crawshaw thepeerage
 The Rt Hon the Lord Crawshaw;biography in Debretts

1934 births
Living people
People from Long Whatton
People from Leicestershire
British people of English descent
People educated at Eton College
Alumni of the Royal Agricultural University
English farmers
English landowners
High Sheriffs of Leicestershire
David Gerald Brooks, 5th Baron Crawshaw
Crawshaw